Zibovnik is a small settlement in the hills above Otave in the Municipality of Cerknica in the Inner Carniola region of Slovenia. It no longer has any permanent residents.

Name
The name of the settlement was changed from Žibovnik to Zibovnik in 1990.

References

External links

Zibovnik on Geopedia

Populated places in the Municipality of Cerknica